Patrick Anderson is a Republican United States politician from the U.S. state of Oklahoma.  He was elected to the Oklahoma Senate in 2004 and was re-elected in 2008 and 2012 by virtue of having no opponents file against him.  He was forced to leave the Oklahoma Senate in November, 2016 because of Constitutional Term Limits.

Senate Committees
Senator Anderson served on Agriculture, Retirement & Insurance, Rules and Tourism and Wildlife.

Positions
Senator Anderson has stated that he opposes the legalization of medical marijuana in Oklahoma. In a statement in the Enid News and Eagle Senator Anderson asserts that legalization is "not worth it".

Election results

References

 Senator Anderson's Official Website
  Oklahoma State Election Board, 2004

Living people
Republican Party Oklahoma state senators
Politicians from Enid, Oklahoma
1967 births
21st-century American politicians